Phacusa crawfurdi is a species of moth in the family Zygaenidae. It is found in south-east Asia, including India, Peninsular Malaysia, the Nicobar Islands, Indonesia (Java, Sumatra, Sulawesi, Ambon, Buru) and the Philippines.

The wingspan is 30 mm. Adults are bronzy black. There are a number of transparent windows in the wings.

References

Moths described in 1858
Procridinae